The 1928 New Mexico gubernatorial election took place on November 6, 1928, in order to elect the Governor of New Mexico. Incumbent Republican Richard C. Dillon won reelection to a second term.

General election

Results

References

gubernatorial
1928
New Mexico
November 1928 events in the United States